Bouteloua simplex, colloquially known as matted grama or mat grama, is a grass species in the grama genus native to much of the Americas.

Description 
Individual blades often curl up; they are short and narrow. Flowering occurs from August to October. Each inflorescence bears 30-80 spikelets.

It is similar to Bouteloua barbata, but bears only a single spike.

Distribution 

Matted grama is widespread in the Americas. It is present in the southwestern and central United States, found as far north as Wyoming, as west as Arizona and Utah, and as east as Texas and Nebraska. An introduced population also exists in Maine, although it is not common there and grows only in disturbed areas. It is present in all the northern states of Mexico, including Baja. Populations exist in most of central America, excepting parts of the Yucatán Peninsula, and extending to Panama. In South America it is found in Ecuador, Colombia, Peru, Bolivia, and parts of Argentina and Chile.

Ethnobotany 
Ashes of the plant had historical use in ceremony, and as a folk remedy. It was also used for livestock forage.

References 

repens
Grasses of North America
Grasses of Mexico
Grasses of the United States
Drought-tolerant plants
Warm-season grasses of North America
Grasses of South America